Lukáš Krajíček (born March 11, 1983) is a Czech former professional ice hockey defenceman. He has previously played in the National Hockey League (NHL) for the Florida Panthers, Vancouver Canucks, Tampa Bay Lightning and Philadelphia Flyers, in the Kontinental Hockey League (KHL) for HC Dinamo Minsk and for HC Oceláři Třinec of the Czech Extraliga (ELH).

Playing career
Krajíček played major junior in the Ontario Hockey League (OHL) with the Peterborough Petes. He posted 35 points in his draft year and was chosen in the first round, 24th overall, by the Florida Panthers in the 2001 NHL Entry Draft. He remained with the Petes for another two seasons and improved to 53 points in 52 games in 2002–03, his final year of junior.

Krajíček split the 2003–04 season between the Panthers and their American Hockey League (AHL) affiliate, the San Antonio Rampage, then played the entirety of 2004–05 with the Rampage due to the NHL lockout. When he returned, he earned a full-time roster spot with the Panthers and posted 16 points in 67 games.

In the off-season, Krajíček was involved in a blockbuster multi-player trade that sent him, Roberto Luongo, and a sixth round draft pick in 2006 to the Vancouver Canucks for Todd Bertuzzi, Alex Auld, and Bryan Allen. He matched his 16-point output of the previous season with the Canucks in 2006–07, but had his second season in Vancouver shortened due to injury.

On October 6, 2008, Krajíček was traded along with prospect Juraj Šimek to the Tampa Bay Lightning for Michel Ouellet and Shane O'Brien.

Krajíček signed with the Philadelphia Flyers on January 31, 2010 after being released by Tampa Bay a week earlier.

On May 27, 2011, Krajíček signed with HC Dinamo Minsk of the KHL and quickly became one of the best defenceman there, forming the first pairing with the young player Dmitri Korobov. He is appreciated for his reliable and smart play in the defensive zone. 
Krajíček was awarded the title of the best defenceman of the first week of the KHL 2011-2012 championship and not long after that he was honored as a HC Dinamo player of the month for his performance during September, chosen by Dinamo fans.

Career statistics

Regular season and playoffs

International

Transactions
 June 23, 2001 — Drafted by the Florida Panthers in the 1st round, 24th overall.
 June 23, 2006 — Traded to the Vancouver Canucks with Roberto Luongo and a 6th round pick in 2006 for Todd Bertuzzi, Bryan Allen and Alex Auld.
 September 8, 2006 — Signed a one-year deal with the Vancouver Canucks.
 July 2, 2007 — Signed a two-year deal with the Vancouver Canucks as a restricted free agent.
 October 6, 2008 — Traded to the Tampa Bay Lightning along with Juraj Šimek in exchange for Michel Ouellet and Shane O'Brien.
 January 30, 2010 — Signed to an unrestricted free agent contract by the Philadelphia Flyers.

References

External links

 

1983 births
Czech ice hockey defencemen
Florida Panthers draft picks
Florida Panthers players
HC Dinamo Minsk players
HC Oceláři Třinec players
Living people
National Hockey League first-round draft picks
Norfolk Admirals players
Olympic ice hockey players of the Czech Republic
Ice hockey players at the 2014 Winter Olympics
Sportspeople from Prostějov
Peterborough Petes (ice hockey) players
Philadelphia Flyers players
San Antonio Rampage players
Tampa Bay Lightning players
Vancouver Canucks players
Czech expatriate ice hockey people
Czech expatriate ice hockey players in the United States
Czech expatriate ice hockey players in Canada
Czech expatriate sportspeople in Belarus
Expatriate ice hockey players in Belarus